Clavulina rugosa, commonly known as the wrinkled coral fungus, is a species of coral fungus in the family Clavulinaceae. It is edible.

Taxonomy
The species was originally described as Clavaria rugosa by Jean Bulliard in 1790. It was transferred to Clavulina by Joseph Schröter in 1888.

References

External links

Edible fungi
Fungi described in 1790
Fungi of North America
rugosa